Final Cut Server was Apple's server-based backend for managing Final Cut Studio files (in particular Final Cut Pro) and workflow automation, based on Proximity's artbox package.  Final Cut Server can catalogue any file type and allows for the addition of custom metadata to make those files searchable. Final Cut Server runs on Apple hardware but the server is accessed through a Java client that runs on PCs and Macs. In addition to Java, Final Cut Server makes heavy use of the QuickTime framework and requires its installation when used with PC clients.

Release and Versions 
Final Cut Server was released for purchase on April 8, 2008.

On July 23, 2009 Final Cut Server was upgraded from v1.1.1 to v1.5.  The release corresponded to the release of a new version of Final Cut Studio.  The upgrade changed the pricing structure by eliminating the original 10-client license and reducing the cost of the unlimited client to $999.  Upgrades from v1.1.1 to v1.5 for both the unlimited license and the older 10-client license were $299.  With the purchase of the upgrade, the 10-client license was converted into an unlimited client license. Notable features upgraded in version 1.5 include the addition of global searches accessible to your workgroup, integration of Active Directory permission sets, improved search engine performance, and an expanded line of proxy settings.

On June 21, 2011, Apple announced the end-of-life of the Final Cut Server product, in favor of Final Cut Pro X.

External links
http://www.apple.com/finalcutserver/
 Press release
Documentation
Krypted.com Final Cut Server Tutorials

Apple Inc. software